Tom Bishop may refer to:

 Tommy Bishop (born 1940), English rugby league player
 Tom Bishop (bowls) (born 1991), English lawn bowler
 Tom Bishop (triathlete) (born 1991), British triathlete

See also
 Thomas Bishop (disambiguation)